A. intermedia  may refer to:
 Acronicta intermedia, a moth species found in Asia
 Adenanthera intermedia, a legume species found only in the Philippines
 Amethysa intermedia, a picture-winged fly species
 Anaxarcha intermedia, a praying mantis species found in India
 Aniba intermedia, a plant species endemic to Brazil
 Apeiba intermedia, a flowering plant species found only in Suriname
 Ardea intermedia, the intermediate egret, median egret or yellow-billed egret, a heron species found from east Africa across tropical southern Asia to Australia
 Atteva intermedia, a moth species endemic to Antigua

Synonyms
 Acacia intermedia, a synonym for Acacia floribunda, a perennial evergreen shrub or tree species native to New South Wales, Queensland and Victoria
 Acampe intermedia, a synonym for Acampe rigida, an orchid species
 Antheraea intermedia, a synonym for Opodiphthera helena, the Helena gum moth, a moth species found along the eastern coast of Australia
 Asota intermedia, a synonym for Asota plana, a moth species found from the Oriental tropics east to New Guinea

See also
 Intermedia (disambiguation)